Wargame: AirLand Battle is a real-time strategy video game developed by Eugen Systems and published by Focus Home Interactive, released on May 29, 2013. It is set in Europe during the Cold War, most specifically in the years 1975–85. It is the sequel to the 2012 Wargame: European Escalation.

Gameplay
Wargames playable factions are the Warsaw Pact, which is subdivided into the Soviet Union, Communist Poland, East Germany, and Czechoslovakia; and NATO, which is subdivided into the United States of America, United Kingdom, France, West Germany, Canada, Sweden, Norway, and Denmark. Players can choose various units from the subfactions of the side they are playing on, unlocking new units or improved variants as they progress. Each country has its own arsenal of units, reflecting their military doctrine. It is possible to create a 'deck' or battlegroup focusing on various criteria, with the option to mix units from multiple nations' armories.

Campaigns 
Wargame: Airland Battle includes four campaigns that can be played alone or cooperatively with another player. The turn-based portions of all four campaigns take place on the same map depicting Northern Europe.

Multiplayer
Wargame: AirLand Battle is a primarily multiplayer game. There are several game modes to play.

The majority of multiplayer games are skirmish battles, where players fight against other players and/or AI generated opponents with custom built decks. These battles vary in size, location, and style, adding to generally unique experience for each game.

Reception

Wargame: AirLand Battle has received generally positive reviews upon release, with a Metacritic score of 80/100.

Sequel
During August 2013 a sequel, Wargame: Red Dragon was announced. It is set during the Cold War but after the original games, in East Asia. It introduces China, Japan, North Korea, South Korea, and the ANZAC (Australia and New Zealand) as new factions. The campaigns focuses around a Korea conflict during the 1980s. It introduces naval warfare to the Wargame series. Wargame: Red Dragon was released in April 2014.

See also

 List of PC exclusive titles
 Wargame: European Escalation
 Wargame: Red Dragon
 Victory! The Battle for Europe

References

External links
 

Alternate history video games
Real-time strategy video games
Video games developed in France
Windows games
Cold War video games
2013 video games
Focus Entertainment games
MacOS games
Linux games
Video games set in Northern Europe
Video games set in Sweden
Video games set in Denmark
Video games set in Norway
Video games set in East Germany
World War III video games